Robert Dorgebray (16 October 1915 – 29 September 2005) was a French cyclist who competed in the 1936 Summer Olympics. He won a gold medal in the team road race event. He also rode in the 1947 and 1949 Tour de France.

References

1915 births
2005 deaths
French male cyclists
Olympic cyclists of France
Cyclists at the 1936 Summer Olympics
Olympic gold medalists for France
Olympic medalists in cycling
Sportspeople from Val-d'Oise
Medalists at the 1936 Summer Olympics
Cyclists from Île-de-France